La Rochefoucauld-en-Angoumois (literally La Rochefoucauld in Angoumois) is a commune in the department of Charente, southwestern France. It was established on 1 January 2019 by merger of the former communes of La Rochefoucauld (the seat) and Saint-Projet-Saint-Constant.

In February 2021, speleologists explored a kilometre-long sepulchral cave containing numerous ceramics and a dozen human skulls. The site, located in the commune, was occupied for more than a millennium during the Bronze Age, until about 900 BC.

Population

See also 
Communes of the Charente department

References 

Rochefoucauldenangoumois
Rochefoucauld-en-Angoumois
Populated places established in 2019
2019 establishments in France